Michael F. O'Hanlon (8 September 1890 – 27 February 1967) was an Irish politician, farmer, journalist and company director. He was a member of Seanad Éireann from 1925 to 1936. He was elected at the 1925 Seanad election for 12 years as a Farmers' Party candidate, and served until the Free State Seanad was abolished in 1936. He was a Cumann na nGaedheal member from 1927–33 and a Fine Gael member from 1933–34. He served as Leas-Chathaoirleach of the Seanad from 1932 to 1934.

References

1890 births
1967 deaths
Cumann na nGaedheal senators
Farmers' Party (Ireland) senators
Fine Gael senators
Irish farmers
Members of the 1925 Seanad
Members of the 1928 Seanad
Members of the 1931 Seanad
Members of the 1934 Seanad
Politicians from County Dublin